Sakis Anastasiadis (Greek: Σάκης Αναστασιάδης; born 1 July 1961) is a Greek professional football manager and former player.

Personal life

He originated from Lefkonas, Serres.

References

1961 births
Living people
Greek footballers
Super League Greece players
Panserraikos F.C. players
Iraklis Thessaloniki F.C. players
Greek football managers
Panserraikos F.C. managers
Athlitiki Enosi Larissa F.C. managers
Iraklis Thessaloniki F.C. managers
Association football midfielders
Greece international footballers
Footballers from Serres